Earl Theus (born 7 October 1963) is a Belizean former cyclist. He competed in two events at the 1988 Summer Olympics.

References

External links
 

1963 births
Living people
Belizean male cyclists
Olympic cyclists of Belize
Cyclists at the 1988 Summer Olympics
Place of birth missing (living people)